Lab Waste is an American hip hop group from Los Angeles, California. It consists of Thavius Beck and Subtitle. In 2005, the duo released the first album, Zwarte Achtegrond, on Temporary Whatever.

Discography

Albums
Zwarte Achtegrond (2005)

EPs
Can I Get It How You Live? (2008)

References

External links

Hip hop groups from California
American musical duos
Hip hop duos
Musical groups from Los Angeles